Jeff Pillars (born July 13, 1958) is an American actor and screenplay writer.  Pillars is originally from Kalamazoo, Michigan. He currently writes and performs for the breakfast radio programme, the John Boy and Billy Big Show in Charlotte, North Carolina. His "Ernest" co-star Duke Ernsberger is a Charlotte native.

Acting filmography

Movies
Critical Condition (1987) - Correction Officer
Born to Race (1988) - Kenny's 'Henderson Hardware' Team
Killer! (1989)
Mr. Destiny (1990) - Duncan the Tow Truck Driver
Super Mario Bros. (1993) - Devo Technician
Ernest Rides Again (1993) - Joe
Road-Kill U.S.A. (1993) - Harvey 
Bandit: Bandit's Silver Angel (1994) - Deputy Ed
Radioland Murders (1994) - Nerdy Stagehand
Bandwagon (1996) - Trumholdt
Bastard Out of Carolina (1996) - Truck Driver
This World, Then the Fireworks (1997) - Galloway
Bloodmoon (1997) - Justice
Ernest in the Army (1998) - Gen. Rodney Lincoln 
The All New Adventures of Laurel & Hardy: For Love or Mummy (1999) - Biker
Pirates of the Plain (1999) - DeGroot
Cold Storage (2006) - Sheriff Bullock

Television
The Night of the Hunter (1991) - Mechanic
In a Child's Name (1991) - Friendly Guard
The Young Indiana Jones Chronicles
 Episode - Young Indiana Jones and the Scandal of 1920 (1993) - Tom
Matlock
 Episode - The Fortune (1993) - Nick Dempsey
 Episode - The Verdict (1995) - Rusty Stambler 
Deadly Pursuits (1996) - Delacroix
The Stepford Husbands (1996) - Gordon
Twilight Man (1996) - Fat Guy
A Kiss So Deadly (1996) - Ray
Any Place But Home (1997) - Melvin the Pig Farmer
The Almost Perfect Bank Robbery (1997) - Ed Syler
From the Earth to the Moon (1998, TV mini-series) - Charlie

Writing filmography
Ernest in the Army (1998) (screenplay)
The All New Adventures of Laurel and Hardy: For Love or Mummy (1999) (co-wrote screenplay)

External links

1958 births
Living people
American male film actors
American male screenwriters
Male actors from Michigan